In mathematics, a Manin triple (g, p, q) consists of a Lie algebra g with a non-degenerate invariant symmetric bilinear form, together with two isotropic subalgebras p and q such that g is the direct sum of p and q as a vector space. A closely related concept is the (classical) Drinfeld double, which is an even dimensional Lie algebra which admits a Manin decomposition.

 classified the Manin triples where g is a complex reductive Lie algebra.

Manin triples and Lie bialgebras

If (g, p, q) is a finite-dimensional Manin triple then p can be made into a Lie bialgebra by letting the cocommutator map p → p ⊗ p be dual to the map q ⊗ q → q (using the fact that the symmetric bilinear form on g identifies q with the dual of p). 

Conversely if p is a Lie bialgebra then one can construct a Manin triple from it by letting q be the dual of p and defining the commutator of p and q to make the bilinear form on g = p ⊕ q invariant.

Examples

Suppose that a is a complex semisimple Lie algebra with invariant symmetric bilinear form. Then there is a Manin triple (g,p,q) with g = a⊕a, with the scalar product on g given by ((w,x),(y,z)) = (w,y) – (x,z). The subalgebra p is the space of diagonal elements (x,x), and the subalgebra q is the space of elements (x,y) with x in a fixed Borel subalgebra containing a Cartan subalgebra h, y in the opposite Borel subalgebra, and where x and y have the same component in h.

References

Lie algebras